Yerkes is a surname. Notable people with the surname include:

Bob Yerkes (born Brayton Walter Yerkes; born 1932), American stuntman
Carroll Yerkes (1903–1950), American baseball pitcher
Charles Yerkes (1837–1905), American financier and art collector involved with developing mass-transit systems
Harry Yerkes (1872–1954), American marimba player, inventor, and recording manager
Mary Agnes Yerkes (1886–1989), American Impressionist painter, photographer, and artisan
Robert Yerkes (1876–1956), American psychologist, ethologist, and primatologist
Royden Yerkes (1881–1964), American Episcopal priest and theologian
Stan Yerkes (1874–1940), American baseball pitcher
Steve Yerkes (1888–1971), American baseball player

See also
Yerkes (disambiguation)
Merritt Yerkes Hughes (1893–1971), American professor and expert in French, English, and Italian literature
Tracy Yerkes Thomas (1899–1983), American mathematician